South Carolina Highway 77 may refer to:

South Carolina Highway 77 (1937), a former state highway from Wallace to the North Carolina state line near Wallace
South Carolina Highway 77 (1981), a former state highway from Columbia to a point on the Woodfield–Dentsville line

077